The Men's decathlon at the 2014 Commonwealth Games as part of the athletics programme was held at Hampden Park on 28 and 29 July 2014.

Australian Jake Stein effectively took himself out of the competition before completing the first event by false starting twice in the 100 metres.  However he persevered through the other nine events and while officially finishing in last place, he put in a performance worthy of the top 5.

Results

References

Men's decathlon
2014